Donald Neville Wallace (11 August 1898 – 10 March 1969) was an Australian rules footballer who played with Footscray in the Victorian Football League (VFL).

Notes

External links 

1898 births
1969 deaths
Australian rules footballers from Victoria (Australia)
Western Bulldogs players
Australian military personnel of World War I